Mount Butung is an inactive volcano located in the municipality of Quezon, Bukidnon province in the island of Mindanao, Philippines.

The Philippine Institute of Volcanology and Seismology (PHIVOLCS) lists Mount Butung as Inactive.

References

See also
List of volcanoes in the Philippines
Ring of Fire

Volcanoes of Mindanao
Inactive volcanoes of the Philippines
Mountains of the Philippines
Landforms of Bukidnon